The Canberra Choral Society (CCS) is an auditioned symphonic choir in Canberra, Australia, and has become one of the most innovative and exciting choirs in the nation's capital. The choir is known both for traditional choral repertoire, and for surprising audiences with new music, new venues, and new ways to experience old favourites. Members range in ages and abilities, and are passionate about working towards performances that capture the impact and energy of the music while maintaining the clarity and subtlety required for excellence in every performance.

A key focus for the choir is an annual "Come and Sing" program, in which up to 120 unauditioned guest singers rehearse with the choir and perform a major work in ANU Llewellyn Hall with professional soloists and orchestra.

History
The Canberra Choral Society originated in 1952 as the Canberra Choral Group with a small group of people who began singing together for their own pleasure and musical advancement. Conductors originally included Ronald Penny, Peter Bailey and Jane Malone, and the Group was recognised as an important part of the early cultural development of Canberra. The name was changed to the Canberra Choral Society in 1960, and the Society became an officially incorporated association in April 1962. For over sixty years CCS has been a leading player the musical life of the city. Its repertoire includes both traditional and contemporary choral music.

Repertoire, Performances and Programs 

The Society had a proven record of performing new works by Australian composers. With assistance from the Federal Governments' arts funding body, the Australia Council, large-scale choral-orchestral compositions were commissioned by the Society for the Australian Bicentenary in 1988 (Richard Mills's Five Meditations from the Poetry of David Campbell) and for the Centenary of Federation in 2001 (Peter and Martin Wesley-Smith's Black Ribbon). Premiere performances of works by resident musical directors have also been a feature of the choir's repertoire.

The Society has performed at the Australian National University, the 2000 Summer Olympics Arts Festival., ABC TV and Radio, the Canberra International Music Festival, the opening of the new Australian Parliament House, the 50th Anniversary of World War II, the Australian National University's 50th anniversary, and the 25th anniversary of the opening of the Sydney Opera House. The Society has performed with many Canberra based choirs, the Canberra Symphony Orchestra, Melbourne Symphony Orchestra, Sydney Symphony Orchestra, the National Capital Orchestra and the Canberra Youth Orchestra.

The Society regularly contributed to community events. It has performed at the Canberra Multicultural Festival and during Floriade, and on special occasions such as the opening of Parliament House. For many years, the Society provided the choir for the annual Anzac Day service held at the Australian War Memorial.

Guest conductors and soloists of national and international repute who have worked with the Society include Nicholas Braithwaite, Joan Carden, Margreta Elkins, Gerald English, Donald Shanks, Clifford Grant and Tobias Cole.

Canberra Choral Society was critical in developing a national Choral Music Lending Scheme that facilitates provision of performing scores to over 100 member choirs across the country and which was instituted in 1965.

Musical Directors
1952–1957 Ronald Penny
1958–1961 Jane Malone
1962–1972 Wilfrid Holland
1972–1976 Ayis Ioannides
1976–1985 Donald Hollier
1985–1989 Hans Günter Mommer
1989–1993 Christopher Lyndon-Gee
1994–1999 Robyn Holmes
2000–2001 Piroska Varga
2001        Christoph Moor
2002–2003 Thomas Burge
2003 John Gilbert (Acting)
2004–2005 Judith Clingan
2006–2010 Peter Pocock 
2011–2016 Tobias Cole
2017 Dianna Nixon
2018–Present Dan Walker

References
Campbell, Peter. Canberra Choral Society: A Capital Choir for a Capital City, PC Publishing, 2002

Notes

External links
http://canberrachoralsociety.org/
Music Lending Scheme

Australian choirs
Choral societies
Musical groups established in 1952
1952 establishments in Australia